Khajuri is a village in the district Yamunanagar, in the state of Haryana, India.The name of sarpanch is Rana Randeep Singh.  It is situated on the khajuri road(Yamunanagar to Karnal via Gumthala). This is the village of Rajput's. This village is known for its development.

Education

Government Middle School, Khajuri
Shri Krishna Public School, Khajuri

References

Villages in Yamunanagar district